Nili Brosh is an Israeli-American guitarist and songwriter. She has performed and/or recorded with Danny Elfman, Cirque du Soleil, Dethklok, Steve Vai, Tony MacAlpine, Paul Gilbert, Andy Timmons, Guthrie Govan/The Aristocrats, Stu Hamm, DragonForce, Jennifer Batten, Gretchen Menn, Alphonso Johnson, Jeff Loomis, Bryan Beller, and The Iron Maidens.

Early life 
Nili Brosh was born in Rishon LeZion, Israel, the fourth child and only daughter of first-generation Israeli parents. Inspired by her brother, Ethan Brosh, Nili started taking classical guitar lessons at the age of 7, later discovering the band Extreme and moving onto electric guitar at the age of 12. That same year, Brosh’s family moved to Boston, MA, where she eventually went to Berklee College of Music.

Career 
Brosh graduated from Berklee College of Music in 2009, and immediately began teaching in the college’s summer guitar programs. She released her debut album, Through The Looking Glass, featuring a guest solo by Andy Timmons, the following year. Also in 2010, she started performing with The Iron Maidens, as well as making guest appearances with Stu Hamm, Andy Timmons, and The Aristocrats.

With Tony MacAlpine 

In 2011 Brosh began working with Tony MacAlpine. The following year, Brosh joined MacAlpine’s touring solo band along with bassist Bjorn Englen and drummer Aquiles Priester. The MacAlpine band toured America and Europe, while Brosh continued working on her second album, A Matter of Perception.

In 2014 Brosh performed in MacAlpine’s Concrete Gardens Live DVD at EMG Pickups TV, playing songs from MacAlpine’s album Concrete Gardens along with drummer Aquiles Priester, bassist Pete Griffin, and guest soloist Jeff Loomis. She also joined the band for the same year’s Maximum Security tour.

Sidewoman/Solo Career 

In 2013, Brosh played rhythm guitar for her brother Ethan Brosh, opening on Yngwie Malmsteen’s Spellbound tour. The following year, while continuing to play with Tony MacAlpine, Brosh released her second album, A Matter of Perception. The album features several rhythm section heavyweights such as drummers Virgil Donati, Marco Minnemann, and Aquiles Priester, and bassists Stu Hamm and Bryan Beller. Throughout the next few years, Brosh focused on giving guitar clinics are well as performing her original music with her band (bassist Eli Marcus, guitarist Alon Mei-Tal, and drummer Ray Rojo), and writing a lesson column for Premier Guitar magazine. In 2017, Brosh joined bassist Alphonso Johnson’s band, along with drummer Chester Thompson.

In 2019, Brosh prepared for the release of her new album Spectrum by giving an Ibanez clinic tour in Canada, and performing her music on tour dates with Batten-Menn-Brosh - a trio show she created with Jennifer Batten and Gretchen Menn. She also played on Bryan Beller’s album Scenes From The Flood, on the track “World Class” alongside John Petrucci. Later on in the year, Brosh joined virtual melodic death metal band Dethklok for a performance at Adult Swim Festival in Los Angeles.

Brosh released her music video and single “Primal Feels” on September 3, 2019, followed by the release of her third album, Spectrum, on December 20, 2019.

Brosh has endorsements with Ibanez Guitars, and EMG Pickups.

With Cirque du Soleil 

In 2017, Nili Brosh joined the cast of Cirque du Soleil’s production “Michael Jackson ONE”, a resident show in Mandalay Bay, Las Vegas. Playing a feature character entitled “The Muse”, Brosh played the iconic guitar solos from Michael Jackson’s music while shooting fire out of her guitar. She succeeded Gina Gleason in the role upon the latter joining Baroness. The show runs on a schedule of ten shows a week, which Brosh was a part of for the following two years. While with Cirque, she also performed in the Life is Beautiful festival in Las Vegas, Paramount Network’s TV show Lip Sync Battle, as well as the national anthem for the Vegas Golden Knights. She left the roster in March 2019, and returned in 2022 as part-time Muse.

With Danny Elfman 

In 2020, Nili joined Danny Elfman's band with the intention of performing at Coachella 2020, which was cancelled due to the COVID pandemic. Subsequently, Nili recorded guitars on Elfman's 2021 and 2022 releases 'Big Mess', 'Bigger. Messier.', and performed with Elfman at his famed 2022 Coachella and Hollywood Bowl performances.

Discography 
Studio albums
 Through The Looking Glass (2010)
 A Matter of Perception (2014)
 Spectrum (2019)

Through the Looking Glass

A Matter of Perception

Spectrum

Estranged 
Singles from Estranged"Estranged"Released: August 24, 2020

Guest Appearances

 2014: Aquiles Priester, Gustavo Carmo - Our Lives, 13 Years Later (guitar solo on “The Bucket is Full
 2017: Jay Matharu - These Clouds Are So Undisciplined! (guitar solo on “Breathe In, Breathe Out”)
 2019: Bryan Beller - Scenes From The Flood (melodies on “World Class”)
 2021: Danny Elfman - Big Mess 
 2022: Danny Elfman - Bigger. Messier.
 2022: Jan Rivera - Existential Paranoia (on "The Encounter")

Compilation albums

 2017: She Rocks, Vol. 1 - “A Matter of Perception”

Video Albums

 2015: Tony MacAlpine - Concrete Gardens - Live at EMGtv

See also 
 The Iron Maidens
 Dethklok
 Cirque du Soleil
 Tony MacAlpine
 Danny Elfman

References

External links 

 Nili Brosh Official site
 Nili Brosh EMG artist page

Living people
Israeli rock guitarists
1988 births
21st-century guitarists
21st-century women guitarists